Avenida General Paz (official name Ruta Nacional A001 - National Route A001) is a beltway freeway surrounding the city of Buenos Aires. Roughly following the boundary between the city and Buenos Aires Province, it is one of the few motorways in Argentina that is toll-free. It carries three lanes of traffic in each direction during most of its length, and five lanes between the Pan-American Highway and the Río de la Plata. There are feeder roads in both directions and there are service areas along its length, usually with a gas station and fast food restaurants.

The route was the first highway in Argentina, built between 1937 and 1941 with a cost of m$n 24 million, and officially inaugurated on July 5, 1941.

History

Federal law number 2,089 of 1887 established the limits of the city of Buenos Aires, including the partidos of Belgrano and the former San José de Flores (now Barrio Flores). In Article 6 of that law it declared that a road was to be built to delimit these with the city of Buenos Aires. Due to the plan of drawing straight lines for the road, an exchange of land was made between the Autonomous City of Buenos Aires and Buenos Aires Province.

Named after José María Paz, the freeway was designed by Pascual Palazzo and construction was directed by José María Zaballa Carbó. It was the first freeway built in the country. The crossings with the most important avenues were grade-separated; more minor cross-streets were served with traffic circles. The road had four lanes, two on each direction and lateral feeder streets of one lane on each side. The pavement was made of reinforced concrete.

Works started on 8 June 1937, completed in two stages, the first from Riachuelo to Liniers (to Ramón Falcón street). The second stage extended from Liniers to Río de la Plata. Works were supervised by Dirección Nacional de Vialidad (the National office that controlled the routes in the country) and carried out by three private companies, "Empresa Argentina de Cemento Armado", "Compañía de Construcciones Civiles S.A.", and "Empresa Sabaría y Garassino Ltda." The freeway was opened to the public on 5 July 1941. 

In the 1970s the roundabout on Avenida del Libertador was replaced by an interchange.

In 1996 the road was modernized and fully grade-separated, widening the road to three lanes on each direction and two feeder streets with two lanes each. To facilitate traffic it was decided that the colectivo bus lines travelled on these feeder roads, except the express service buses, which stop on these feeders. These streets have speed bumps that limit speed to 40 kilometers per hour (25 mph).

Gallery

References

External links

 Buenos Aires government current and historical maps

National roads in Buenos Aires
National roads in Buenos Aires Province
General Paz
1941 in transport
Ring roads